= SMA Negeri 19 Bandung =

SMAN 19 Bandung
- Jalan Dago Pojok; Bandung, Indonesia, West Java

Information
- Motto: Aji Ajen Anoraga (Knowledge and Service with Humility)
- Established: 22 November 1985; 40 years ago
- Principal: Dra. Entin Kartini
- Enrollment: 322
- Accreditation: A
- Website: http://sman19bdg.indosatschool.com

SMA Negeri (SMAN) 19 Bandung, is a public high school located at Dago Pojok Street in Bandung, West Java. The same as any high school in Indonesia, the education period in SMAN 19 Bandung is completed on 3 years, starting from 10th grade to 12th grade. SMAN 19 Bandung is located at Dago Pojok Street. As of 2013, SMAN 19 Bandung has 5 natural science classes and 4 social study classes for the 12th graders and 7 natural science classes and 2 social study classes for the 11th graders.

== History ==
SMA Negeri 19 Bandung was established by The Indonesian Ministry of Culture and Education act number: 0601/01/1985 about the establishment of Senior High School that was ratified at Jakarta on 22 November 1985, signed by Soetanto Wirjoprasonto as General Secretary. With the act signed, SMAN 19 Bandung was recognised as the 1.333th school in Indonesia. As a newly established school, SMAN 19 Bandung doesn't have school facilities such as a school building or other supporting facilities, SMA Negeri 19 Bandung at that time shares building with SMA Negeri 5 Bandung at Jl.Belitung No.5. In school year 1986–1987, SMA Negeri 19 Bandung moved to a new location at Jl.Ir.H.Juanda (Dago Pojok) in Northern Bandung.
